Mukino is a rural locality (a village) in Nebylovskoye Rural Settlement, Yuryev-Polsky District, Vladimir Oblast, Russia. The population was 13 as of 2010.

Geography 
Mukino is located 8 km east from Nebyloye, 33 km southeast of Yuryev-Polsky (the district's administrative centre) by road. Tartyshevo is the nearest rural locality.

References 

Rural localities in Yuryev-Polsky District